Perfecto Presents: Travelling is a mix album by Paul Oakenfold.

Released in 2000, it reached number 12 on the UK Compilation Chart, and launched the Perfecto Presents series, which continued with Perfecto Presents: Another World later in the year.

Track listing

Disc 1
 Velvet Girl - "Velvet" (Chiller Twist Cosmosis Remix) (7:50)
 Timo Maas - "Ubik" (The Dance Remix) (5:41)
 Jazzy M - "Jazzin' the Way You Know" (Menage a Trois Remix) (4:43)
 Dave Kane - "Clarkness" (Slacker Remix) (6:21)
 Tone Depth - "Point 7" (5:55)
 Altitude - "Night Stalker" (5:41)
 Leama - "Melodica" (10:28)
 Bunker - "Descent" (6:01)
 Planet Perfecto - "Bullet in the Gun 2000" (Rabbit in the Moon Mix) (5:09)
 Bullitt - "Cried to Dream" (Max Graham Remix) (10:01)
 Max Graham - "Bar None" (6:02)

Disc 2
 Brancaccio & Aisher - "Darker" (Reset the Breaks Mix) (6:47)
 PMT - "Gyromancer" (False Prophet Mix) (5:42)
 Azzido da Bass - "Dooms Night" (Timo Maas Remix) (5:24)
 Lyric - "Over Emotion" (5:32)
 The Utah Saints - "Lost Vagueness" (Oliver Lieb Vocal Remix) (5:42)
 Mekka - "Diamondback" (6:04)
 Jan Johnston - "Flesh" (Tiësto Remix) (6:52)
 Blackwatch - "North Sky" (6:16)
 Goldenscan - "Sunrise" (DJ Tiësto Remix) (5:15)
 Delerium - "Silence" (DJ Tiësto in Search of Sunrise Remix) (10:12)
 Element Four - "Big Brother" (9:58)

Charts

Certifications

References

Paul Oakenfold remix albums
2000 remix albums